Reeves's pheasant (Syrmaticus reevesii) is a large pheasant within the genus Syrmaticus. It is endemic to China. It is named after the British naturalist John Reeves, who first introduced live specimens to Europe in 1831.

Description

The male is brightly plumaged with a scaled golden white and red body plumage, grey legs, brown iris and bare red skin around the eye. The head is white with a black narrow band across its eyes. The male has an extremely long silvery white tail barred with chestnut brown. This pheasant is mentioned in the 2008 edition of Guinness World Records for having the longest natural tail feather of any bird species; a record formerly held by the crested argus pheasant.

They are brown with a blackish crown, a buff face and greyish brown barred tail feathers. The females are about the same size as a male common pheasant.

There are no known subspecies, but there is some variation in plumage.

Distribution and habitat

The Reeves's pheasant is endemic to the temperate evergreen and deciduous forests of central and eastern China. Where introduced, they also inhabit farmland close to woodlands. The tail of the male bird grows approximately  every year.

They have been introduced for sport and ornamental purposes to the United States, Czech Republic, France and the United Kingdom. In the latter three countries, they have built up small breeding populations, and are still released on a small scale for shooting, often alongside common pheasants.

Behaviour

The Reeves's pheasant is a hardy bird and is able to tolerate both hot and cold weather. They prefer higher ground for nesting. The female lays a clutch of 7–14 eggs in April or May; the incubation period is 24–25 days. Reeves's pheasants are often aggressive towards humans, animals, and other pheasants, particularly during the breeding season.

Their call is unlike other game birds in that it is a musical warble, sounding more passerine than a galliform bird. Their diet is vegetable matter, including seeds and cereals. They are fairly common in aviculture.

Conservation
Due to ongoing habitat loss, and overhunting for food and its tail plumes, the Reeves's pheasant is evaluated as Vulnerable on the IUCN Red List of Threatened Species. There are thought to be only around 2000 birds remaining in the wild.
The species is included in Appendix II of the Convention on International Trade in Endangered Species (CITES) meaning international export/import (including in parts and derivatives such as feathers) requires CITES documentation to be obtained and presented to border authorities.

See also
 List of endangered and protected species of China

References

External links

 Reeves Pheasant at Game Birds and Wildfowl
 
 
 
 
 

Reeves's pheasant
Birds of China
Endemic birds of China
Reeves's pheasant
Reeves's pheasant
Game birds